George Fleming Moore (July 31, 1887 – December 2, 1949) was a decorated officer of the United States Army with the rank of major general. General Moore commanded the Harbor Defenses of Manila and Subic Bays and the Philippine Coast Artillery during the Battle of Bataan.

Early life and education
George Fleming Moore was born on July 31, 1887, in Austin, Texas, as the son of John Marks Moore, Jr. and Mary Estelle Grace Moore. He graduated from A&M College of Texas in 1908 and received a commission in 1909 into the Coast Artillery Corps.

Texas A&M
A major and lieutenant colonel during World War I, he returned to Texas A&M as Commandant of Cadets from 1937 to 1940, where he was promoted to colonel.

World War II
In World War II, then Brigadier General Moore fought in the Bataan Campaign, later becoming the commander of the Harbor Defenses of Manila and Subic Bays in the Philippines, both during the 1941–42 Japanese invasion. He was given command of the Philippine Coast Artillery with roughly 5,000 men and four forts to defend Corregidor. On May 6, 1942, General Jonathan Wainwright surrendered the Corregidor garrison at about 1:30 p.m., leading himself and General Moore to be captured by the Japanese, and held as a POW, later liberated in August 1945. General Moore was awarded the Distinguished Service Cross and Distinguished Service Medal while in captivity.

Family
He was married to Lucile (Lucille) Griffith (March 10, 1892 – April 5, 1972), daughter of  John Williams Griffith and Mary Elizabeth (Fox) of Port Townsend, WA.  They had one daughter, Anne (later Mrs. Burton R. Browne).

Death
Moore never recovered his health from captivity; he shot himself on December 2, 1949, shortly after retirement, in Hillsborough, CA. The Moores are buried at Golden Gate National Cemetery, San Bruno, California.

Awards and honors

Moore received some of the Army´s highest decorations including the Distinguished Service Cross and the Distinguished Service Medal with Oak Leaf Cluster.

Moore Hall, a residence hall at Texas A&M University, is named in his honor.

Ribbon bar

See also

 Jonathan M. Wainwright
 Edward P. King
 Samuel L. Howard
 George M. Parker

References

1887 births
1949 deaths
United States Army generals
American prisoners of war in World War II
World War II prisoners of war held by Japan
Bataan Death March prisoners
Texas A&M University alumni
Recipients of the Distinguished Service Cross (United States)
Recipients of the Distinguished Service Medal (US Army)
Burials at Golden Gate National Cemetery
United States Army generals of World War II
United States Army personnel of World War I